Katja Oeljeklaus (born 10 February 1971) is a former professional tennis player from Germany.

She comes from the town of Ladbergen in North Rhine-Westphalia.

A right-handed player, Oeljeklaus began competing on the professional tour in 1990. Her best performance on the WTA Tour was a semifinal appearance at the St. Petersburg Open in 1991, a year in which she reached her best ranking of 98 in the world. This allowed her to feature in the main draw of the Australian Open, French Open and Wimbledon Championships in 1992.

She is now known as Katja Brünemeyer.

ITF finals

Singles (1–5)

Doubles (1–2)

References

External links
 
 

1971 births
Living people
German female tennis players
People from Steinfurt (district)
Sportspeople from Münster (region)
Tennis people from North Rhine-Westphalia
West German female tennis players